Sergio is a 2020 American biographical drama film about the United Nations diplomat Sérgio Vieira de Mello. The film is directed by Greg Barker, from a screenplay written by Craig Borten. It stars Wagner Moura, Ana de Armas, Garret Dillahunt, Clemens Schick, Will Dalton, Bradley Whitford and Brían F. O'Byrne.

The film had its world premiere at the Sundance Film Festival on January 28, 2020. It was released on April 17, 2020, by Netflix.

Plot
In 2003, United Nations' Special Representative in Iraq, Sérgio Vieira de Mello, is a victim of a bombing and becomes trapped in the basement of the hotel where he was working in Baghdad.

Three months earlier, Sergio is married but there is no feeling of love in the marriage. Instead, he commits to being with Carolina, his girlfriend and co-worker. Against the advice of Carolina, Sergio decides to go to Baghdad after the 2003 invasion of Iraq in order to help Iraqis achieve independence and negotiate the withdrawal of American troops. He comes to a disagreement with American diplomat Paul Bremer who opposes his methods despite the pressure from the United States, and fights against the U.S. occupation of Iraq. He even insists on not having U.S. guards at the UN's base camp in order to separate themselves from the U.S. occupiers.

Sergio is killed by a terrorist attack that takes place on the UN base camp. Later, the U.S. pulls out of Iraq leading to a long Civil War, but Sergio's gravely injured colleague Gil Loescher survives despite having both legs amputated, and Carolina returns to her justice work in Rio.

Cast
 Wagner Moura as Sérgio Vieira de Mello, Special Representative of the UN Secretary-General to Iraq
 Ana de Armas as Carolina Larriera, UN economic consultant and Sérgio's girlfriend
 Garret Dillahunt as Master Sergeant William von Zehle, a US Army Reserve Civil Affairs soldier
 Brían F. O'Byrne as Gil Loescher, Sérgio's deputy and long time associate 
 Will Dalton as Sergeant Andre Valentine, a US Army Reserve combat medic
 Clemens Schick as Gaby Pichon, Sérgio's bodyguard
 Bradley Whitford as Paul Bremer, Administrator of the Coalition Provisional Authority in Iraq
 Pedro Hossi as Xanana Gusmão, leader of the East Timorese independence movement
 Vithaya Pansringarm as Abdurrahman Wahid, president of Indonesia
 Sahajak Boonthanakit as Ieng Sary, leader of the Khmer Rouge
  as Mieke Bos, UN Executive Assistant
 Sameera Asir as Nadia Younes, Chief of Staff for Vieira de Mello

Production
In July 2018, it was announced Wagner Moura, Ana de Armas, Garret Dillahunt, Brían F. O'Byrne, Will Dalton and Clemens Schick had joined the cast of the film, with Greg Barker directing from a screenplay by Craig Borten, with Netflix distributing. In October 2018, Bradley Whitford joined the cast of the film.

Principal photography began in August 2018.

Release
It had its world premiere at the Sundance Film Festival on January 28, 2020. It was released on April 17, 2020.

Critical response
The website's critics consensus reads: "While the real-life story that inspired Sergio is certainly worthy of a biopic, its misguided approach to its noble subject adds up to a disappointingly shallow drama." On Metacritic, the film holds a rating of 55 out of 100, based on 16 critics, indicating "mixed or average reviews".

References

External links
 
 

2020 films
American biographical drama films
2020 biographical drama films
Films directed by Greg Barker
Films scored by Fernando Velázquez
English-language Netflix original films
2020s English-language films
2020s American films